Pseudocatharylla nemesis is a moth in the family Crambidae. It was described by Stanisław Błeszyński in 1964. It is found in Ivory Coast.

References

Endemic fauna of Ivory Coast
Crambinae
Moths described in 1964